The National Taiwan Library is a library in Zhonghe District, New Taipei, Taiwan. It is the oldest public library in Taiwan.  Founded in 1914, the library is home to a large collection of documents concerning the history, culture, politics and geography of Taiwan.

History 
The library's first permanent home on Bo'ai Road (博愛路) in Taipei was destroyed in a United States bombing raid during World War II.

After the Nationalists took over control of the island following Japan's defeat in World War II, the library was renamed the Taiwan Provincial Library and moved to temporary accommodation. The implication of this name, as well as all the subsequent names, is that Taiwan is only one part of the Republic of China.

In 1947, it was again renamed, this time to Taiwan Provincial Taipei Library and it was under this name that the library was relocated to Xinsheng South Road (新生南路) in 1963.

The current name of the library was chosen in 1973, with the full official title being National Central Library, Taiwan Branch. After outgrowing the premises in Taipei city, the library was relocated to the 8-23 Memorial Park in Zhonghe, Taipei County (now New Taipei City) in 2004.

In 2007, Huang Wen-ling was appointed as the twentieth director of the National Taiwan Library, and the first woman to hold the post.

Collection 

The library is home to a large collection of documents related to Taiwan, some dating back to the Qing Dynasty era in Taiwan (i.e. pre-1895). There are 210,000 documents from the Japanese era (1895–1945) and the collection has been continuously added to since then. The library's aim is to provide a dedicated research centre for people interested in Taiwan Studies, offering traditional written material sources as well as information resources for researchers to locate the documents or information needed.

Services for the visually impaired are also a key focus for the institution, with a collection of 12,000 Braille books together with information technology resources for readers.

Conservation 
A pioneer of book conservation techniques in Taiwan, the library is now home to a dedicated "Book Hospital" which serves not only as a centre for restoration of old books, but also a location for staff from other institutions to learn the craft.

See also 
Academia Sinica
National Central Library

References 

1914 establishments in Taiwan
Library buildings completed in 2004
Zhonghe District
Buildings and structures in New Taipei
Tourist attractions in New Taipei
Education in New Taipei
Public libraries in Taiwan